SM U-77 was one of 329 submarines serving in the Imperial German Navy in World War I, engaged in commerce warfare during the First Battle of the Atlantic.

Design
German Type UE I submarines were preceded by the longer Type U 66 submarines. U-77 had a displacement of  when at the surface and  while submerged. The submarine was powered by two  engines for use while surfaced, and two  engines for use while submerged. She had two propeller shafts.

U-77 was fitted with two  torpedo tubes (one at the port bow and one starboard stern), four torpedoes, and one  deck gun. She had a complement of thirty-two (twenty-eight crew members and four officers).

Operations 
U-77 was commanded by Kaptlt Erich Günzel, who was lost with her. She came off the stocks at Hamburg (Vulcan) in 1916; in May and June was at Kiel School, and first entered North Sea with U-76 on 29 June, to join the 1st Half Flotilla.
5 July 1916. It seems possible she sank in  before midnight 7 July 1916 as a result of some accident. Before this she had laid mines off Kinnaird Head.

Previously recorded fate
U-77 was thought to have sunk off Dunbar, Scotland in a minehandling accident. The submarine involved was actually U-74.

References

Notes

Citations

Bibliography

World War I submarines of Germany
1916 ships
U-boats commissioned in 1916
Ships built in Hamburg
Maritime incidents in 1916
U-boats sunk in 1916
German Type UE I submarines
U-boats sunk by unknown causes
World War I shipwrecks in the North Sea
Ships lost with all hands
Missing U-boats of World War I